Surname of Swiss origin (Zurich area). Currently people with the family name Wydler are also found in the United States and Argentina where they have emigrated in the early 20th century.

 Heinrich Wydler (1800–1883), a Swiss botanist
 John W. Wydler (1924–1987), an American politician
 Thomas Wydler (1959 - ), a Swiss musician

References